Edward Edwin Miller (July 22, 1880 – August 1, 1946) was a U.S. Representative from Illinois.

Biography
Born in Creston, Iowa, Miller attended the common schools. He moved to East St. Louis, St. Clair County, Illinois, in 1892, where he entered the real estate and insurance business in 1900. He served as private secretary to Congressman William A. Rodenberg and as a delegate to the Republican National Convention in 1912. He was the state treasurer of Illinois from 1921 to 1923.

Miller was elected as a Republican to the Sixty-eighth Congress (March 4, 1923 – March 3, 1925), but he declined to be a candidate for renomination in 1924. He then went back into real estate and insurance until 1942, whereupon he served as Director of Transportation for American Red Cross at St. Louis, Missouri, until his death on August 1, 1946. He was interred in St. Clair Memorial Park Cemetery, East St. Louis, Illinois.

References

1880 births
1946 deaths
People from Creston, Iowa
State treasurers of Illinois
Republican Party members of the United States House of Representatives from Illinois
People from East St. Louis, Illinois
20th-century American politicians